The 2002 NAPA Auto Parts 500 was a NASCAR Winston Cup Series stock car race held on April 28, 2002 at California Speedway in Fontana, California. Contested over 250 laps on the 2-mile (3.23 km) asphalt D-shaped oval, it was the tenth race of the 2002 Winston Cup Series season. Jimmie Johnson of Hendrick Motorsports won the race, his first career Winston Cup Series victory. Kurt Busch finished second and Ricky Rudd finished third.

Background

The track's turns are banked from fourteen degrees, while the front stretch, the location of the finish line, is banked at eleven degrees. Unlike the front stretch, the back straightaway is banked at three degrees.

Summary
There were ten drivers who failed to finish the race; with five of the drivers forcing to leave the race due to terminal crashes while five other drivers had engine issues. Nearly 10% of the 199-minute race was held under a caution flag and the average green flag run was approximately 38 laps.

Dale Earnhardt Jr. suffered a concussion when Kevin Harvick slowed on the track and veered into Earnhardt Jr.'s path, causing Jr. to hit the outside retaining wall parallel on the driver's side (this was before SAFER barriers were installed). The impact bent the dashboard of Jr.'s car and severely disoriented him; this ultimately forced NASCAR to pass a regulation forcing drivers to take the ambulance ride to the infield care center every time they crashed (he did not admit to have this injury until mid-September, after which NASCAR also passed a new concussion protocol).

Race results

Race Statistics
 Time of race: 3:19:53
 Average Speed: 
 Pole Speed: 
 Cautions: 5 for 24 laps
 Margin of Victory: 0.620 sec
 Lead changes: 20
 Percent of race run under caution: 9.6%         
 Average green flag run: 37.7 laps

References

NAPA Auto Parts 500
NAPA Auto Parts 500
NAPA Auto Parts 500
NASCAR races at Auto Club Speedway